Ricardo Ruiz may refer to:
 Ricardo Ruiz (artist), Mexican-Cherokee artist 
 Ricky Ruiz (born 1996), American soccer player
 Ricki Ruiz, member of the Oregon House of Representatives